Rupert Mearse Wells (November 28, 1835 – May 11, 1902) was speaker of the Legislature of Ontario in 1874 to 1879 and served as Liberal MLA for Bruce South from 1872 to 1882. He represented Bruce East in the House of Commons of Canada from 1883 to 1887 as a Liberal.

He was born in Prescott County in Upper Canada in 1835 and attended the University of Toronto. He studied law, was called to the bar in 1857 and entered the practice of law in L'Orignal. He joined the law practice of Edward Blake in 1860 and left that firm to partner with Angus Morrison in 1870. He served as attorney for York County and the city of Toronto in 1872. He was elected to the provincial legislature in an 1872 by-election after Edward Blake resigned to retain his seat in the federal parliament. In 1876, he was named Queen's Counsel.

External links
 
 
The Canadian parliamentary companion and annual register, 1879, CH Mackintosh 
 

1835 births
1902 deaths
Speakers of the Legislative Assembly of Ontario
Ontario Liberal Party MPPs
Liberal Party of Canada MPs
Members of the House of Commons of Canada from Ontario
Canadian King's Counsel